Live-Loud-Alive: Loudness in Tokyo is the first live album by the Japanese band Loudness. It was recorded and released in 1983. The instrumental track "Tusk of Jaguar" appears on Akira Takasaki's first solo album with the same name. The opening theme is taken from "The Planets" by Gustav Holst, performed by the Orchestre National de l'Opera de Montecarlo, conducted by Antonio de Almeida. The home video release of another concert of the same tour was released as the band's first live VHS/Beta and Laserdisc at almost the same time of the double LP and with the same title. The video was remastered and re-released in DVD in 2005.

Track listing

Double LP
Side one
"Opening Theme - Mars the Bringer of War" - 2:24
"In the Mirror" - 3:44
"Road Racer" - 4:27
"I Was the Sun" - 4:12
"Fly Away" - 3:30

Side two
"Black Wall" - 5:20
"Tusk of Jaguar" - 3:13
"Drum Solo" - 4:22
"Mr. Yesman" - 6:59

Side three
"Exploder" - 3:30
"Heavenward" - 2:29
"Loudness" - 5:20
"Sleepless Night" - 7:50

Side four
"Speed" - 5:41
"Shinkiro" - 4:00
"Burning Love" - 5:38
"Ending Theme - Theme of Loudness II"

VHS and DVD
"Opening - Theme of Loudness II"
"In the Mirror"
"Lonely Player"
"Angel Dust"
"Drum Solo"
"Exploder - Heavenward"
"Loudness"
"Sleepless Night"
"Speed"
"Road Racer"
"Sexy Woman"
"Burning Love"
"Ending - Far from the Mother Land"

Personnel
Loudness
Minoru Niihara - vocals
Akira Takasaki - guitars, backing vocals
Masayoshi Yamashita - bass, Taurus pedals, backing vocals
Munetaka Higuchi - drums

LP production
Masahiro Miyazawa - engineer, mixing
Teruo Tanaka, Yuzo Toki - assistant engineers
Hiroyuki Munekiyo - coordinator
Mikio Shimizu, Toshi Nakashita - executive producers

VHS production
Masayoshi Kubo, Masaharu Takayama - producers
Toshi Nakashita, Masayuki Miyashita - executive producers

References

1983 live albums
Live video albums
Loudness (band) live albums
1983 video albums
Loudness (band) video albums
Nippon Columbia live albums
Columbia Records video albums
Albums recorded at Nakano Sun Plaza
Japanese-language live albums
Japanese-language video albums